London (Gilbertese: Ronton; historically: Londres) is a settlement in Kiribati, located on the island of Kiritimati, within the archipelago of Line Islands. In 2015, it was inhabited by 1,899 people, making it the second most populated of the four settlements of the island.

London is the headquarters of the Ministry of Line and Phoenix Islands Development.

The other main villages of Kiritimati are Banana and Tabwakea, which are located along the main road on the northern coast of the island, and Poland, which is across the main lagoon to the South.

Climate 
London has a tropical savanna climate (Köppen climate classification: Aw).

References

Populated places in Kiribati
Kiritimati